Moorside may refer to any of these places in England:
Moorside, Cheshire
Moorside, County Durham
Moorside, Cumbria
Moorside nuclear power station
Moorside railway station (Cumbria)
Moorside, Dorset
Moorside, Kirklees, West Yorkshire
Moorside, Leeds, West Yorkshire
Moorside, Oldham, Greater Manchester
Moorside, Swinton, Greater Manchester
Moorside railway station
Moorside, North Tyneside, Tyne and Wear
Moorside, Sunderland, Tyne and Wear

See also
Moorside High School (disambiguation)
The Moorside, a 2017 British television drama 
Hannah Moorside, a character in the British soap-opera Coronation Street